Mehdiabad (also Romanized as Mehdīābād and Mahdīābād) is a village in Milajerd Rural District, Milajerd District, Komijan County, Markazi Province, Iran. At the 2006 census, its population was 172, in 40 families.

References 

Populated places in Komijan County